Patricia Dowling (born October 27, 1942) is an American politician in the state of New Hampshire. She is a member of the New Hampshire House of Representatives, sitting as a Republican from the Rockingham 6 district, having been first elected in 2010. She previously served from 1990-2002 and 2004-2012.

References

Living people
1942 births
Members of the New Hampshire House of Representatives